
Year 924 (CMXXIV) was a leap year starting on Thursday (link will display the full calendar) of the Julian calendar.

Events 
 By place 

 Byzantine Empire 
 Byzantine–Bulgarian War: Forces led by Simeon I, ruler (knyaz) of the Bulgarian Empire, arrive before the walls of Constantinople, after they have pillaged the suburbs of the capital. Simeon meets Emperor Romanos I on the Golden Horn to arrange a truce, according to which he pays the Bulgarians an annual tax. Simeon in return cedes back some cities on the Black Sea coast. 

 Europe 
 Spring – King Berengar I makes a new alliance with the Hungarians who, following his death, sack and burn the city of Pavia. They cross the Alps via the St. Bernard Pass, where Provence and Septimania (Southern France) are pillaged. Hungarian forces penetrate as far as the Pyrenees.
 Summer – King Ordoño II of Galicia dies after a 14-year reign. He is succeeded by his brother Fruela II, reuniting Asturias now known as the Kingdom of León. Fruela, who is not popular with the nobles, has assassinated the sons of Olmundo, possible descendants of the Visigothic king Wittiza. 
 Fall – Bulgarian–Serbian War: Tsar Simeon I sends a punitive expedition force against Serbia, led by Theodore Sigritsa and Marmais, but they are ambushed and defeated. Zaharija, prince of the Serbs, sends their heads and armour later to Constantinople (approximate date). 
 Winter – The Hungarians invade Saxony and force King Henry I (the Fowler) to retreat into the Castle of Werla. He makes a pact and agrees to pay them tribute for 9 years. They return to the Po Valley and sack the cities of Bergamo, Brescia and Mantua (Northern Italy). 

 Britain 
 July 17 – King Edward the Elder dies at Farndon after a 25-year reign in which he has gained direct control over Mercia, including the Danish-occupied areas. He is succeeded by his eldest son Æthelstan, who will reign as King of England (see 927). He continues his father's conquest of the Danelaw north of the Thames-Lea line from the Vikings.

 Asia 
 Emperor Taizu of the Liao Dynasty leads a campaign to the West. He reaches the former capital of the Uyghur Kingdom on the Orkhon River. The Zubu begin to pay tribute to the Khitan Empire.
 Emperor Zhuang Zong of Later Tang bestows the chancellor title on Gao Jixing (Prince of Nanping) and creates the Nanping State (Central China). The Qi State falls to Later Tang.
 March – The Qarmatians of Bahrayn attack and destroy the returning Hajj caravans at al-Habir, leading to the downfall and execution of the Abbasid Caliphate's vizier, Ibn al-Furat.

Births 
 Fujiwara no Koretada, Japanese statesman and waka poet (d. 972)
 Fujiwara no Yoritada, Japanese nobleman and regent (d. 989)
 Gao Baoxu, king of Nanping (Ten Kingdoms) (d. 962)
 Li Jingda, prince of Southern Tang (d. 971)
 Nyaung-u Sawrahan, king of the Pagan dynasty (d. 1001)
 Đinh Bộ Lĩnh, Emperor of Viet Nam (d.979)

Deaths 
 January 20 – Li Jitao, general of Later Tang
 April 7 – Berengar I, king of Italy and Holy Roman Emperor
 April 11 – Herman I, archbishop of Cologne
 May 17 – Li Maozhen, Chinese warlord and king (b. 856)
 June 16 – Li Cunshen, general of Later Tang (b. 862)
 July 24 – Edward the Elder, king of Wessex
 July 18 – Abu'l-Hasan Ali ibn al-Furat, Abbasid vizier (b. 855)
 August 2 – Ælfweard, son of Edward the Elder
 Damian of Tarsus, Muslim governor
 Gyeongmyeong, king of Silla (Korea)
 Marmais, Bulgarian nobleman 
 Ordoño II, king of Galicia and León
 Raymond II, Frankish nobleman
 Theodore Sigritsa, Bulgarian minister
 Yuan Xiangxian, Chinese general
 Zaharija, prince of Serbia (approximate date)

References